Sukumar Samajpati (born 1939) was an Indian professional football player. He was part of the Indian squad that finished runners-up at the 1964 AFC Asian Cup in Israel.

Playing career
Studied at the University of Calcutta, Samajpati played for Chuni Goswami led Mohun Bagan AC in 1960, before switching to East Bengal Club in domestic football. In Mohun Bagan, he was mentored by club legend Balaidas Chatterjee and participated in foreign tours. He captained the "red and gold brigade" in 1965–66. During his playing days in East Bengal, he was guided by Sushil Bhattacharya, club's first head coach. He scored overall 46 goals with East Bengal between 1961 and 1968.

With India, he scored a goal in their 3–1 win over Hong Kong at the 1964 AFC Asian Cup.

Honours

Mohun Bagan
Durand Cup: 1960
Calcutta Football League: 1960
IFA Shield: 1960

India
AFC Asian Cup runners-up: 1964

Individual
 East Bengal "Lifetime Achievement Award": 2011

See also
List of East Bengal Club captains
History of the India national football team

References

Bibliography

1939 births
Living people
Indian footballers
Footballers from Kolkata
India international footballers
1964 AFC Asian Cup players
East Bengal Club players
Association footballers not categorized by position
Calcutta Football League players